Zheltovsky is a stratovolcano located in the southern part of the Kamchatka Peninsula, Russia.

See also
 List of volcanoes in Russia
 List of ultras of Northeast Asia

References

External links
 "Vulkan Zheltovsky, Russia" on Peakbagger

Mountains of the Kamchatka Peninsula
Volcanoes of the Kamchatka Peninsula
Active volcanoes
Stratovolcanoes of Russia
Holocene stratovolcanoes